SNCF's BB 25500 class are part of a series of electric locomotives built by Alsthom. They are the dual system version of the BB 17000 (AC) and BB 8500 (DC) locomotives (17000+8500=25500). They are fitted with monomotor bogies with two different gear ratios. This allows them to have either increased tractive effort for freight, or a higher top speed. This makes them suitable for both freight and passenger trains.

They were built in three distinct batches leading to detail differences. They remain in use as mixed traffic locomotives, mostly with TER and Transilien.

Romania
Ten locomotives (25517, 25518, 25523, 25524, 25528, 25536, 25570, 25572, 25576 and 25581) have been exported to Romania. They work with former SNCF Rio carriages for Regiotrans.  

Unfortunately, 25536 caught fire on 5 December 2017 at Cața station whilst hauling a freight train.

Services worked are:
Brașov - Bucharest
Brașov - Bucharest - Constanţa (Summer)

The locomotives have been renumbered by adding 400,000 to their SNCF numbers.

References

Alstom locomotives
B′B′ locomotives
B-B locomotives
25500
Standard gauge electric locomotives of France
1500 V DC locomotives
25 kV AC locomotives
Railway locomotives introduced in 1964
Multi-system locomotives
Standard gauge locomotives of Romania